Erna is a rural locality (a settlement) in Oshibskoye Rural Settlement, Kudymkarsky District, Perm Krai, Russia. The population was 192 as of 2010. There are 10 streets.

Geography 
Erna is located 69 km northeast of Kudymkar (the district's administrative centre) by road. Sharvol is the nearest rural locality.

References 

Rural localities in Kudymkarsky District